Misery Loves Co.  is the debut and self-titled album by Misery Loves Co. It was nominated for a Grammi at the Swedish Grammis awards in 1995 and was also listed as one of the 100 greatest rock albums of all times in Kerrang (1996). A music video was made for the opening track "My Mind Still Speaks" featuring a male teenager who, after suffering neglect and physical abuse, decides to run away from home; interspersed are shots of the band performing the song at a concert.

Track listing

1995 albums
Misery Loves Co. albums